Fuvahmulah Airport is a domestic airport located on the island of Fuvahmulah (also known as Fuvahmulaku) in Gnaviyani Atoll, Maldives. It was opened in November 2011.

Facilities

Taxiway width, surface and strength is, Width: 15 M, 
Surface: Asphalt,
Strength: PCN15/F/B/X/T

Airlines and destinations

Airlines offering scheduled passenger service:

See also
 List of airports in the Maldives
 List of airlines of the Maldives

References

Airports in the Maldives
2011 establishments in the Maldives
Airports established in 2011